Mahmudabad-e Bala may refer to:
 Mahmudabad-e Bala, Kohgiluyeh and Boyer-Ahmad
 Mahmudabad-e Bala, Razavi Khorasan